Derek Schiavone (born May 9, 1985 in Fort Erie, Ontario) is a professional Canadian football kicker and punter who is currently a free agent. He was signed by the Edmonton Eskimos as an undrafted free agent in 2008. He also played for the Montreal Alouettes. He played CIS football for the Western Ontario Mustangs. He was released by the Redblacks on April 16, 2014.

References

1985 births
Living people
Canadian football placekickers
Canadian football punters
Edmonton Elks players
Montreal Alouettes players
People from Fort Erie, Ontario
Players of Canadian football from Ontario
Western Mustangs football players